Fagerbakke is a surname. Notable people with the surname include:

Bill Fagerbakke (born 1957), American actor
Knut Fagerbakke (born 1952), Norwegian politician